The Politics of Yueyang in Hunan province in the People's Republic of China is structured in a dual party-government system like all other governing institutions in mainland China.

The Mayor of Yueyang is the highest-ranking official in the People's Government of Yueyang or Yueyang Municipal Government. However, in the city's dual party-government governing system, the Mayor has less power than the Communist Party of Yueyang Municipal Committee Secretary, colloquially termed the "CPC Party Chief of Yueyang" or "Communist Party Secretary of Yueyang".

History
On May 26, 2014, Yang Baohua was put under investigation by the Central Commission for Discipline Inspection (CCDI) for "serious violations of laws and regulations".

On April 21, 2020, the current Party chief Liu Hesheng was put under investigation for alleged "serious violations of discipline and laws" by the Central Commission for Discipline Inspection (CCDI), the party's internal disciplinary body, and the National Supervisory Commission, the highest anti-corruption agency of China.

List of mayors of Yueyang

List of CPC Party secretaries of Yueyang

References

Yueyang
Yueyang